The 1992–93 Magyar Kupa (English: Hungarian Cup) was the 53rd season of Hungary's annual knock-out cup football competition.

Quarter-finals

|}

Semi-finals

|}

Final

See also
 1992–93 Nemzeti Bajnokság I

References

External links
 Official site 
 soccerway.com

1992–93 in Hungarian football
1992–93 domestic association football cups
1992-93